James Minter Knepper (November 22, 1927 – June 14, 2003) was an American jazz trombonist.  In addition to his own recordings as leader, Knepper performed and recorded with Charlie Barnet, Woody Herman, Claude Thornhill, Stan Kenton, Benny Goodman, Gil Evans, Thad Jones and Mel Lewis, Toshiko Akiyoshi and Lew Tabackin, and, most famously, Charles Mingus in the late 1950s and early 1960s. Knepper died in 2003 of complications of Parkinson's disease.

Biography
Knepper was born in Los Angeles, California, United States, the second son of a nurse and a police officer. His parents divorced shortly after his birth, and his mother had to take her abusive husband to court in order to get child support.  He and his older brother, Robert, were sent to several boarding and military schools, Page Military Academy and St. John's Military Academy, while their mother worked. He picked up his first instrument, an alto horn, at the age of six while he was a pupil there.  His first teacher persuaded him to put aside the alto and pick up the trombone because, as he said, he had a "trombone mouth".  He played his first professional gigs in Los Angeles, and traveled to Spokane, Washington, at the age of 15.  He graduated high school, and later attended classes at Los Angeles Community College.

Knepper married Maxine Helen Fields, a trumpet player with the all-female jazz band the International Sweethearts of Rhythm on May 8, 1954, at a civil ceremony in Tucson, Arizona, while he was on a tour with the Maynard Ferguson Band.  They had two children, a daughter, Robin Reid Knepper Mahonen, and a son, Timothy Jay Knepper, who predeceased him.  Knepper chose the names "Robin" and "Jay" to honor his idol, Charlie Parker, whom the jazz world knew as "Bird".  He had four grandchildren.

In 1959, the U.S. State Department funded a trip for bandleader Herbie Mann to visit Africa, after they heard his version of "African Suite."   In a stroke of serendipity, Knepper replaced Willie Dennis as trombonist in the band for this tour.
 
The 14-week tour took place from December 31 1959 to April 5, 1960. The musicians were:
Herbie Mann, bandleader, flute and sax;
Johnny Rae, vibist and arranger;
Don Payne, bass;
Doc Cheatham, trumpet;
Jimmy Knepper, trombone; 
Carlos "Patato" Valdes, conguero;
Jose Mangual, bongos.
Destinations listed on official itinerary: 
Sierra Leone, Liberia, Nigeria, Mozambique, Rhodesia, Tanganyika, Kenya, Ethiopia, Sudan, Morocco, Tunisia. 
Knepper documented this tour meticulously in a series of letters he sent home to his wife, Maxine, his daughter, Robin, and his son, Timothy. These letters were recently found carefully preserved in a dusty box in the attic of the family home, and have now been transcribed by his daughter. They provide a fascinating glimpse into the inner circles of a notable piece of jazz history, and the life of a touring musician, who was also a devoted family man. He paints vivid portraits of the personal life of the musicians he worked with, and his descriptions of the Africa's landscapes and people provide a vivid portrait of an era in which there were few civil rights for Africans in their own lands.  Knepper's daughter is hoping to publish these letters. 

In 1962, Knepper toured the Soviet Union with Benny Goodman's Big Band, as part of a cultural exchange during the Cold War, in which the Bolshoi Ballet also came to the US. This groundbreaking yet disastrous tour was also documented in Knepper's letters.

Knepper also played in the pit orchestra through the entire run of the Broadway show Funny Girl, with Barbra Streisand, and later, Mimi Hines.  After seventeen previews, the Broadway production opened on March 26, 1964, at the Winter Garden Theatre, subsequently transferring to the Majestic Theatre and the Broadway Theatre to complete its total run of 1,348 performances.  In 1967 and 1968, he played in the pit orchestra at the Mark Hellinger Theater for An Evening with Marlene Dietrich, for which Dietrich received a Tony Award in 1968.  He also appeared on and off Broadway in On Your Toes, and The Me Nobody Knows.

While he was playing Funny Girl, Knepper became a member of the Thad Jones/Mel Lewis Orchestra, a big band formed by trumpeter Thad Jones and drummer Mel Lewis around 1965, which began the 40-year tradition of Monday night jazz shows at the Village Vanguard in New York's Greenwich Village. The band performed for twelve years in its original incarnation, but since the death of Lewis in 1990 it has been known as the Vanguard Jazz Orchestra. They have maintained a Monday-night residency at the Village Vanguard for four decades.  Knepper again toured the USSR, this time with TJML, as well as Japan and Europe with them, and appeared with them at the Montreux Jazz Festival in 1974.

In 1969, Knepper toured and recorded You Never Know Who Your Friends Are, with keyboardist Al Kooper, in the jazz period which followed his departure from Blood, Sweat and Tears.  Knepper appeared on this concert tour which included shows at the Philadelphia Spectrum, and in Atlanta, where he briefly met Janis Joplin.

In 1980, he received a Grammy Award nomination, for "Best Jazz Instrumentalist Performance, Soloist", for his album, Cunningbird.

Knepper received "Best Trombonist" award from DownBeat Reader's Poll four years running from 1981 to 1984; he also achieved first place in the DownBeat Critics' Poll in 1981, and then five years running from 1983 to 1987.

With Mingus
Although Knepper worked with some of the most notable jazz musicians of the 20th century, he was perhaps best known for his collaboration and stormy relationship with bassist and composer, Charles Mingus.

Mingus' temper was notoriously bad, and he twice hit Knepper.  Once, while onstage at a memorial concert in Philadelphia, Mingus reportedly attempted to crush the hands of his pianist, Toshiko Akiyoshi, with the instrument's keyboard cover, then punched Knepper; however, the legitimacy of this story has been called into question by both Akiyoshi and Mingus's son Eric Mingus.  Later, Mingus reportedly punched Knepper in the mouth while the two men were working together at Mingus's apartment on a score for Epitaph, in preparation for what became his disastrous concert at New York Town Hall, on October 12, 1962. The blow broke one of Knepper's teeth, ruined his embouchure and resulted in the loss of the top octave of his range on the trombone for almost two years.  This attack ended their working relationship, and Knepper was unable to perform at the concert. Charged with assault, Mingus appeared in court in January 1963 and was given a suspended sentence.  According to his daughter, Robin, Mingus also later mailed heroin to Knepper's home, and made an anonymous phone call to the police. A little girl at the time, she remembers the police questioning her father after the mailman delivered the package.  Nevertheless, in the 1970s, the two eventually reconciled thoroughly enough to play together in concert and on at least one of Mingus' last albums.
 
Following Mingus' death, and the death of the first Mingus Dynasty bandleader, drummer Dannie Richmond, Knepper led the Mingus Dynasty Orchestra, and toured the Middle East and Europe.

Discography

As leader
 Jazz Workshop Presents: "Jimmy Knepper" (Debut, 1957; Danish EP reissued on Mingus Rarities, Volume 1, OJC)
 A Swinging Introduction to Jimmy Knepper (Bethlehem, 1957) 
 The Pepper-Knepper Quintet (MetroJazz Records, 1958) 
 Cunningbird (Steeplechase, 1976)
 Jimmy Knepper in L.A. (Inner City, 1977) 
 Just Friends (Hep, 1978) with Joe Temperley
 Tell Me... (Daybreak, 1979)
 Primrose Path (Hep, 1980) with Bobby Wellins
 1st Place (BlackHawk, 1982 [1986])
 I Dream Too Much (Soul Note, 1984) 
 Dream Dancing (Criss Cross Jazz, 1986)
 T-Bop (Soul Note, 1991) with Eric Felten

As sideman
With Charles Mingus
 Tijuana Moods (1957) RCA
 East Coasting (1957) Bethlehem
 A Modern Jazz Symposium of Music and Poetry (1957) Bethlehem 
 The Clown (1957) Atlantic
 Mingus Ah Um (1959) Columbia
 Mingus Dynasty (1959) Columbia
 Blues & Roots (1959) Atlantic
 Mingus Revisited (1960) Mercury
 Reincarnation of a Lovebird (1960) Candid
 Oh Yeah (1961) Atlantic, 
 Tonight at Noon (1957–61) Atlantic
 Cumbia & Jazz Fusion (1978) Atlantic

With Mose Allison
 Swingin' Machine (Atlantic, 1963)
With Joshua Breakstone
Evening Star (Contemporary, 1988)
With Benny Carter
Central City Sketches (MusicMasters, 1987)
With Richard Davis
 Muses for Richard Davis (MPS, 1969)
With Gil Evans
 Out of the Cool (1960) Impulse!
 The Individualism of Gil Evans (1964) Verve
 Blues in Orbit (Enja, 1971)
 Where Flamingos Fly (1971) Artists House
 Collaboration with Helen Merrill (1987) EmArcy
With Ricky Ford
 Shorter Ideas (Muse, 1984)
With Dizzy Gillespie
 Perceptions (Verve, 1961)

With Langston Hughes
 Weary Blues (MGM, 1959)
With Clark Terry
 Color Changes (Candid, 1960)
With Kai Winding
 The Incredible Kai Winding Trombones (1960) Impulse!
With Chuck Israels
 National Jazz Ensemble directed by Chuck Israels (Chiaroscuro, 1976)
With Herbie Mann
 My Kinda Groove (Atlantic, 1964)
 Our Mann Flute (Atlantic, 1966)
With Kenny Burrell
 Guitar Forms (Verve, 1965)
With Gary Burton
 A Genuine Tong Funeral (RCA, 1967)
With the Jazz Composer's Orchestra
 The Jazz Composer's Orchestra (1968) JCOA
 Escalator over the Hill with Carla Bley (1971) JCOA
With the Thad Jones/Mel Lewis Orchestra
 The Big Band Sound of Thad Jones/Mel Lewis featuring Miss Ruth Brown (1968) Solid State
 Monday Night (1968) Solid State
 Central Park North (1969) Solid State
 Basle, 1969 (1996) TCB Music – recorded 1969
 Consummation (1970) Solid State
 Suite for Pops (1972) A&M
 Live in Tokyo (1974) Denon Jazz
 Potpourri (1974) Philadelphia International
 Thad Jones / Mel Lewis and Manuel De Sica (1974) PAUSA
With Dick Katz
 In High Profile (Bee Hive, 1984)
With Lee Konitz
 Lee Konitz Nonet (Chiaroscuro, 1977)
 Yes, Yes, Nonet (SteepleChase, 1979)
 Live at Laren (Soul Note, 1979 [1984])
With Al Kooper
 You Never Know Who Your Friends Are (1969) Columbia

With the Toshiko Akiyoshi – Lew Tabackin Big Band
 Road Time (1976) RCA/Victor

With George Adams & Dannie Richmond
 Hand to Hand  (1980) Soul Note
 Gentleman's Agreement (1983) Soul Note

With Mingus Dynasty
 Chair In The Sky (Electra 1979)
 Live at Montreux (Atlantic 1980)
 Reincarnation (Soul Note 1982)
 Mingus' Sounds of Love (Soul Note 1987)
 Live at the Theatre Boulogne-Billancourt/Paris, Vol. 1 (Soul Note 1988)
 Live at the Theatre Boulogne-Billancourt/Paris, Vol. 2 (Soul Note 1988)

References

External links
 [ Jimmy Knepper at Allmusic.com]
 Jimmy Knepper at Trombone Page of the World

American jazz trombonists
Male trombonists
Neurological disease deaths in West Virginia
Deaths from Parkinson's disease
1927 births
2003 deaths
Musicians from Los Angeles
Criss Cross Jazz artists
SteepleChase Records artists
Inner City Records artists
Place of death missing
20th-century American musicians
20th-century trombonists
Jazz musicians from California
20th-century American male musicians
American male jazz musicians
Mingus Big Band members
The Thad Jones/Mel Lewis Orchestra members
Earle Spencer Orchestra members
American Jazz Orchestra members
Atlantic Records artists
Hep Records artists